Pterophorus virgo is a moth of the family Pterophoridae. It is known from Cameroon and Equatorial Guinea.

References

virgo
Moths of Africa
Moths described in 1913